The Mountain Health Arena, originally known as the Huntington Civic Center, later as the Huntington Civic Arena and later, for sponsorship reasons as the Big Sandy Superstore Arena, is a municipal complex located in the downtown area of Huntington, West Virginia, one block west of Pullman Square. The arena consists of a 9,000-seat multi-purpose arena and an attached conference center. It is home to numerous concerts and events, and was the home of the Huntington Hammer of the Ultimate Indoor Football League for 2011. Marshall University's graduation ceremonies are also held at the arena.  It was renamed for sponsorship reason to its current name in 2019.

History 
The $10.5 million Huntington Civic Center was completed in 1977 and was the largest in the state of West Virginia when it opened.

At the time, the city felt it would not be able to accommodate Marshall University basketball, and the arena was thus built in a location that Marshall objected to, and used a design that was not sports friendly.  Marshall thus remained at the older Veterans Memorial Fieldhouse and then constructed its own on-campus arena, the Cam Henderson Center, in 1981.  At first the building was very successful; however, the completion of a larger arena in nearby Charleston, and the 25-year delay in construction of what became Pullman Square caused the building to become a money losing effort for the city.  The city then decided to turn the building over to private management.

From 1993 to 2000, the facility, by then called the Huntington Civic Arena, was home to the Huntington Blizzard of the ECHL. At this time the arena was modified to accommodate hockey and other team sports.  In addition, the arena served as the home of the River Cities LocoMotives of the NIFL during their only season in 2001. The facility then served as the home for the American Indoor Football Association's Huntington Heroes. The team moved to the arena after spending their inaugural season in 2006 at the Veterans Memorial Fieldhouse.

The naming rights for the arena were purchased by Big Sandy Superstores, a regional chain of furniture and appliance stores, when this deal expired it resumed its generic name for a short time before the sponsorship rights were acquired by Mountain Health Network, the owners of Cabell Huntington Hospital and St. Mary's Medical Center. The facility is currently managed by ASM Global.

The Ultimate Indoor Football League chose Huntington, West Virginia as the home of their second team.  The team was named the Huntington Hammer.

Renovations 

In fall 1997, $3.5 million was allocated in bonds to renovate the aging Civic Center; however, work did not begin until 2000. The 20-year-old facility had not been renovated or maintained since its initial construction. The interior and exterior were repainted in gray and maroon and the leaky roof was repaired. The conference area was expanded and the kitchen facility was upgraded. In late 2011 the building was closed for four months for another renovation, including replacement of all seating. In 2012, the arena purchased the basketball floor from the soon-to-be-demolished Veterans Memorial Fieldhouse. The floor was originally installed in the Cam Henderson Center and was sold to the Fieldhouse when the current Henderson Center floor was installed. At the time the floor was purchased from the Fieldhouse, it still had the markings and logos from Marshall University's Mid-American Conference era.

References

External links
 

Indoor arenas in West Virginia
Indoor ice hockey venues in the United States
Buildings and structures in Huntington, West Virginia
Sports venues in West Virginia
Music venues in West Virginia
Tourist attractions in Cabell County, West Virginia
1977 establishments in West Virginia
Sports venues completed in 1977
Music venues completed in 1977